Deathstalker Honour is a science fiction novel by British author Simon R Green.

The fifth in a series of nine novels, Deathstalker Honour is part homage to - and part parody of - the classic space operas of the 1950s, and deals with the timeless themes of honour, love, courage and betrayal.
 
Set in a far-future fictional universe, Deathstalker Honour develops the plot and themes introduced in the previous books in the series. 

1998 British novels
British science fiction novels
Victor Gollancz Ltd books